
Gmina Busko-Zdrój is an urban-rural gmina (administrative district) in Busko County, Świętokrzyskie Voivodeship, in south-central Poland.

The gmina contains parts of the protected areas called Nida Landscape Park and Szaniec Landscape Park.

Villages
Apart from the town of Busko-Zdrój, Gmina Busko-Zdrój contains the villages and settlements of Baranów, Bilczów, Biniątki, Błoniec, Bronina, Budzyń, Chotelek, Dobrowoda, Elżbiecin, Gadawa, Galów, Janina, Kameduły, Kawczyce, Kołaczkowice, Kostki Duże, Kostki Małe, Kotki, Łagiewniki, Las Winiarski, Mikułowice, Młyny, Nowa Wieś, Nowy Folwark, Oleszki, Olganów, Owczary, Palonki, Pęczelice, Podgaje, Radzanów, Ruczynów, Siesławice, Skorzów, Skotniki Duże, Skotniki Małe, Słabkowice, Służów, Szaniec, Szczaworyż, Wełecz, Widuchowa, Wolica, Zbludowice, Zbrodzice, Żerniki Górne and Zwierzyniec.

Neighbouring gminas
Gmina Busko-Zdrój is bordered by the gminas of Chmielnik, Gnojno, Nowy Korczyn, Pińczów, Solec-Zdrój, Stopnica and Wiślica.

References
Polish official population figures 2006

Busko-Zdroj
Gmina Busko Zdroj